The American Society for Quality (ASQ), formerly the American Society for Quality Control (ASQC), is a society of quality professionals, with nearly 80,000 members.

History
ASQC was established on 16 February 1946 by 253 members in Milwaukee, Wisconsin, with George D. Edwards as its first president. The organization was first created as a way for quality experts and manufacturers to sustain quality-improvement techniques used during World War II.

In 1948, ASQC's Code of Ethics establishes standards for members to conduct their activities and business. Business writer Armand V. Feigenbaum served as president of the society in 1961–63.

In 1997, the members of the organization voted to change its name from "American Society for Quality Control" to "American Society for Quality".

Today, ASQ is a global organization with members in more than 140 countries. ASQ operates regional centers in North Asia, South Asia, Latin America, the Middle East/Africa and has established strategic alliances with 24 organizations through the World Partners® Program in countries like Brazil, Canada, and the United Arab Emirates to promote ASQ products and training.

Quality 
ASQ provides its members with certification, training, publications, conferences, and other services. ASQ is a founding partner of the American Customer Satisfaction Index (ACSI), a quarterly economic indicator.

Since 1989, ASQ has administered the annual Malcolm Baldrige National Quality Award. The ASQ also gives the Dorian Shainin Medal, which is awarded annually for the "Development and Application of Creative or Unique Statistical Approaches in the Solving of Problems Relative to the Quality of Product or Service".

Certifications
ASQ offers 18 professional certifications relating to various aspects of the quality profession. Professional certification exams are translated into five languages included English, Korean, Mandarin, Portuguese, and Spanish. Exams are given nationally and, to a limited degree, worldwide several times annually. The body of knowledge for each certification is maintained through peer review every few years on a rotating schedule.

In 1968, the first ASQ certification was offered.

In 2016, ASQ's certification exam delivery method changed from paper to computer based testing at Prometric nationwide testing facilities.

Publications 
ASQ publishes a range of magazines and journals:

Conferences 
ASQ hosts a number of quality events and annual conferences worldwide:

See also
 European Foundation for Quality Management (EFQM)
 Total Quality Management (TQM)
 Technometrics

References 

Organizations established in 1946
Organizations based in Milwaukee
Professional associations based in the United States
Quality
1946 establishments in the United States